Cape San Juan Light (Faro de Las Cabezas de San Juan) is a historic lighthouse located on the northeastern part of the highest point of Cape San Juan in Fajardo, Puerto Rico. The lighthouse was constructed in 1880 and was officially lit on May 2, 1882. The original illuminating apparatus, not changed until after 1898, had an  range and displayed a fixed white light which every three minutes flashed red.

The lighthouse owned by the Puerto Rico Conservation Trust is part of the Las Cabezas de San Juan Nature Reserve. The   reserve includes a bioluminescence bay, rare flora and fauna, various trails and boardwalks, and a  scientific research center. Despite its small size, the reserve shelters seven different ecological systems, including beaches, lagoons, dry forest, coral reefs and mangroves.

In 1898, the lighthouse played a major role in the Battle of Fajardo during the Puerto Rican Campaign of the Spanish–American War. The lighthouse was listed in the National Register of Historic Places by the United States government on October 22, 1981.

In 2001, under the National Historic Lighthouse Preservation Act, it became the first lighthouse to be transferred to a non-governmental organization in Puerto Rico.

Gallery

See also
 List of lighthouses in Puerto Rico

References

External links
 Faro De Las Cabezas De San Juan. National Park Service

 Las Cabezas de San Juan Reserva Natural 'El Faro'. Lonely Planet review
 Puerto Rico Conservation Trust

Lighthouses completed in 1882
Fajardo, Puerto Rico
Historic American Engineering Record in Puerto Rico
Lighthouses on the National Register of Historic Places in Puerto Rico
Spanish Colonial architecture in Puerto Rico
Neoclassical architecture in Puerto Rico
1882 establishments in Puerto Rico